The Cinema of David Cronenberg: From Baron of Blood to Cultural Hero is a 2008 book by Ernest Mathijs about the films of director David Cronenberg.  Mathijs had previous done his PhD thesis on the reception of Cronenberg's films, and this book was based on that research.

Reception 
Martin Fradley of Film Quarterly wrote, "Mathijs is especially successful when he looks beyond the major career landmarks" and "admirably situates the films in wider context".  However, Fradley says that Mathijs focuses too much on "excessively detailed plot summaries".  Dejan Ognjanovic of Beyond Hollywood wrote that it is "a study whose main value lies in exploring the reception (and misconceptions) of Cronenberg’s films, but has very little to add to clarifying them and enabling a better understanding of their essence."  Science fiction critic Rob Latham  wrote that the book "makes a decent stab" at a comprehensive study of Cronenberg.

References 

2008 non-fiction books
Non-fiction books about film directors and producers